The  singles Tournament at the 1983 Virginia Slims of Atlanta took place between April 25 and May 1 on outdoor hard courts in Atlanta, United States. Pam Shriver won the title, defeating Kathy Jordan in the final.

Draw

Finals

Top half

Bottom half

References
 Main Draw, ITFTennis.com.

1983 Singles
Virginia Slims of Atlanta - Singles
1983 in sports in Georgia (U.S. state)